"'Let Me Down Easy'" is a song by Roger Daltrey, who at the time was the former lead singer of The Who. The song was written by Bryan Adams and Jim Vallance and included on Daltrey's sixth solo album Under a Raging Moon as the first track on the second side of the LP. The album was a tribute to The Who's former drummer Keith Moon. The song was released as a single in November 1985 on Atlantic Records.

The single reached number 86 on the US Hot 100 singles chart and number 11 on Billboard's Top Rock Tracks chart.

Background
When Jim Vallance was asked about the track, he recalled that they wrote the song during January 1984 and that: "Adams and I originally wrote "Let Me Down Easy" for Stevie Nicks, but I don't know if she ever heard the song. Regardless, I thought Roger did a superb job." 
Bryan Adams appears in the original music video.

Reception
Cash Box said it's an "intimately passionate track which...makes good use of Daltrey’s powerful lead vocals."

Personnel
 Roger Daltrey - lead vocals
 Bryan Adams - rhythm guitar, backing Vocals
 Robbie McIntosh - lead guitar, guitar solo
 Mark Brzezicki - drums 
 John Siegler - bass guitar
 Nick Glennie-Smith - organ
 Alan Shacklock - tambourine 
 Annie McCaig - backing vocals
 John Payne - backing vocals
 Mark Williamson - backing vocals

Charts

References

External links

1985 songs
1985 singles
Songs written by Bryan Adams
Songs written by Jim Vallance
Rock ballads
Atlantic Records singles